Dorrisville may refer to:
Dorrisville, California, former name of Alturas, California
Dorrisville, Illinois, a neighborhood in Harrisburg, Illinois